Léa Garcia (born March 11, 1933) is a Brazilian actress. She is known for her numerous television and film roles. Her breakout role was in the Oscar-winning Black Orpheus, in which she portrayed Serafina, Eurydice's cousin.

Television roles
 2007 Luz do Sol - Edite (Babá)
 2006 Cidadão Brasileiro - Dadá
 2001 O Clone - Lola
 Você Decide
o 1999 Juízo Final
o 1996 O Professor
o 1996 Retrato em Preto e Branco
 1999 Suave Veneno - Selma
 1997 Anjo Mau - Cida
 1996 Xica da Silva - Bastiana
 1996 O Campeão
 1995 Tocaia Grande
 1994 A Viagem - Natália
 1993 Agosto - Sebastiana
 1990 Araponga - Mundica
 1990 Desejo - Mariana
 1989 Pacto de Sangue - Rute
 1988 Abolição
 1987 Helena - Chica
 1986 Dona Beija - Flaviana
 1983 Bandidos da Falange - Gladys
 1980 Marina - Leila
 1978 Maria, Maria - Rita
 1976 Escrava Isaura - Rosa
 1975 A Moreninha - Duda
 1974 Fogo Sobre Terra - Lana
 1974 Feliz na Ilusão (Caso Especial)
 1973 Os Ossos do Barão
 1972 Selva de Pedra - Elza
 1972 Meu Primeiro Baile (Caso Especial)
 1971 O Homem que Deve Morrer - Luana
 1971 Minha Doce Namorada
 1969 Acorrentados - Irmã Serafina

Film roles
 2006 Memórias da Chibata - 35mm - Avó de Juca
 2006 Nzinga
 2006 Mulheres do Brasil - Eunice
 2006 The Greatest Love of All - Zezé
 2006 Memorias da Chibata - Zeelândia 
 2005 Vinícius
 2005 As Filhas do Vento (Daughters of the Wind) - Jú
 2002 Viva Sapato!
 1999 Orfeu - Mãe de Maicol
 1998 Cruz e Sousa - O Poeta do Desterro - Carolina
 1984 Quilombo
 1978 A Deusa Negra
 1978 A Noiva da Cidade
 1977 Ladrões de Cinema
 1976 Feminino Plural
 1974 O Forte
 1969 Em Compasso de Espera - Zefa
 1964 Santo Módico
 1963 Ganga Zumba - Cipriana
 1960 Os Bandeirantes - Herminia
 1959 Black Orpheus - Serafina

References

External links

1933 births
Living people
Brazilian film actresses
Brazilian television actresses
Actresses from Rio de Janeiro (city)